UVO (all caps) is an acronym.  It can mean...

 A telematics system from Kia Motors, Kia UVO.
 Ukrainian Military Organization (UVO), a Ukrainian resistance and sabotage movement active in Poland between the world wars.
 Used vegetable oil, used cooking oil recycled for use as a biofuel without conversion to biodiesel.